William E. Andrew  is the seventh chancellor of the University of Prince Edward Island, Canada. He was elected in 2004.

References

Year of birth missing (living people)
Living people
Canadian university and college chancellors
University of Prince Edward Island
Academics in Prince Edward Island